The National Symphony Orchestra (NSO), also known as Taiwan Philharmonic outside Taiwan, is one of the leading orchestras in Asia. Since 1987, the orchestra has its residence in the National Theater and Concert Hall (Taiwan) in Taipei, Taiwan.

Activities

Subscription Concert Series 
In the year of 2002, NSO held a series of five concerts that featured all nine symphonies and five piano concertos by Ludwig van Beethoven. The concerts, called a discovery cycle, became NSO's regular Subscription Concert Series later since the 2004/2005 season. In each season, there are ten concerts consisting of at least one orchestral work of a composer.

From September 2004 to June 2008, four Subscription Concert Series have been presented.

 2007/2008 Tchaikovsky
 2006/2007 Richard Strauss
 2005/2006 Shostakovich
 2004/2005 Mahler
 2002/2003 Beethoven
In the 2008/2009 season, a newly created MyNSO series took place of the Subscription Concert Series.

Opera Series 
Already in November 1994, NSO performed opera in National Concert Hall, Der fliegende Holländer was led by Prof. TSENG Dao-hsiung, in December 2000, Jahja Ling performed Hänsel und Gretel. Under Chien Wen-pin's directorship, he first tried a semi-stage performance of the Third Act of Die Walküre in May 2002, this experience became NSO's regular NSO Opera Series from the 2002/2003 season. In each season, there are two opera directed by cross-over artist in Taiwan, the cast consisted mainly local singers.

From December 2002 to December 2007, fourteen operas have been produced, many of them were Taiwan's premier*.

 2007/2008  Die Fledermaus
 2006/2007  *Der Ring des Nibelungen (complete), Die lustige Witwe
 2005/2006  Così fan tutte, Le nozze di Figaro
 2004/2005  *Norma, *Falstaff
 2003/2004  *La damnation de Faust, Don Giovanni
 2002/2003  Tosca, *Tristan und Isolde

Fairy Tale Forever Series 
From April 2002 to April 2008, NSO has been collaborated with four different performing groups and organizations for bringing musical experiences to the young audiences.

 2007/2008  Peer Gynt
 2006/2007  Le Carnaval des Animaux
 2005/2006  Firebird
 2004/2005  Secret in the Woods
 2003/2004  Pied Piper Fantasy
 2002/2003  Peter and the Wolf

Artistic Direction 
 Gerard Akoka, artistic advisor and principal conductor 1986-1990
 Urs Schneider, artistic advisor and principal conductor 1991-1992
 Hsu Chang-huei, music director (commissioner) 1994
 Chang Da-sheng, music director 1995-1997
 Jahja Ling, music director 1998-2001
 Chien Wen-pin, music director 2001-2007
 Günther Herbig, artistic advisor and principal guest conductor 2008-2010
 Lu Shao-chia, music director 2010-2021
 Jun Märkl, artistic advisor 2021, Music Director 2022-

Musicians 
 Concertmasters  Wu Ting-yu, Li I-ching
 Associate concertmaster  Teng Hao-tun
 Assistant Conductor  Chang Yin-fang

 Strings (14-14-11-9-8)
 Woodwinds (4-4-4-4)
 Brass (6-4-3-0)
 Timpani & Percussion (5)
 Harp (1)'''

Recordings 

NSO has published the following recordings under their own label of "NSO Live":

 Chien Wen-pin & NSO Live: Mahler Symphony No. 4 & Shostakovich Symphony No. 8 (2008)
 Lü Shao-chia & NSO Live: Shostakovich Symphony No. 4 & Ein Heldenleben (2009)
 Günther Herbig & NSO Live: Mahler Symphony No. 6 (2009)
 Bruckner Symphony No. 9 Live with Günther Herbig (2010)
 Mahler Symphony No. 9 Live with Günther Herbig (2010)

Projects with conductor Lim Kek-tjiang and Rudolf Barshai are also scheduled.

Staffs 
 Executive Director
Joyce Chiou

Planning & Production
Marketing & Development
Administration

 Chairman of the board of directors, National Performing Arts Center
JU Tzong-ching

 Executive and artistic director, National Theater and Concert Hall
LEE Huey-mei

See also 
 List of symphony orchestras in Taiwan
 National Theater and Concert Hall (Taiwan)

References

External links 
 

1986 establishments in Taiwan
Musical groups established in 1986
Taiwanese orchestras